Seurasaari is an island and a district in Helsinki, Finland, known mostly as the location of the Seurasaari Open-Air Museum, which consists of old, mainly wooden buildings transplanted from elsewhere in Finland and placed in the dense forest landscape of the island.

Every summer, many Helsinkians come to Seurasaari to enjoy the rural, peaceful outdoor atmosphere. Despite the visitors, the island has a variety of wildlife, especially birds, but also red squirrels and hares. The height of the island's popularity is at Midsummer, when a huge bonfire is built on a small isle just off the island's coast, and ignited by a newlywed couple. Thousands of people, both tourists and Helsinkians, watch the burning of the bonfire from both Seurasaari itself and from boats anchored near it.

Seurasaari also includes one of only two nudist beaches in Helsinki and one of only three in the entire country. Unlike the other nudist beaches, the beach is segregated for men and women separately with no unisex nudist area and is subject to a fee.

Gallery

See also
 Architecture of Finland

References

External links

 The Seurasaari Open-Air Museum
 The Seurasaari Foundation

Meilahti
Islands of Helsinki
Museums in Helsinki
Open-air museums in Finland
Folk museums in Europe
Geography of Helsinki
Islands of Uusimaa